Timothy Wong may refer to:
Timothy C. Wong (born 1941), American sinologist
Timothy Wong Man-kong, Hong Kong historian
Timothy Wong Yik, Hong Kong singer and actor
Timothy Wong (swimmer), Jamaican swimmer, see Jamaica at the 2003 Pan American Games